Navnit Dholakia, Baron Dholakia  (born 4 March 1937) is a British Liberal Democrat politician and the Deputy Leader of the Liberal Democrats in the House of Lords.

Education
Educated in India and Tanzania, Dholakia came to Britain to study at Brighton Technical College. He took his first job as Medical Laboratory Technician at Southlands Hospital in Shoreham-by-Sea.

Political career
He became active in the Liberal party and was elected to Brighton Borough Council between 1961 and 1964.

From 1976 he served as member of the Commission for Racial Equality and has been involved in the Sussex Police Authority, Police Complaints Authority and Howard League for Penal Reform. He is the current chair of Nacro, and also chairs its Race Issues Advisory Committee.

Dholakia was created a life peer as Baron Dholakia, of Waltham Brooks in the County of West Sussex on 24 October 1997, and sat on the Liberal Democrat benches in the House of Lords.

From 1997 to 2002 he served as a Liberal Democrat whip in the House, and from 2002 to 2004 he was the Home Affairs Spokesman.

He was elected President of the Liberal Democrats at the end of 1999 and served in the post from 2000 to 2004. In November 2004 he was elected joint Deputy Leader of the Liberal Democrats in the House of Lords. In 2010 he became the sole Deputy Leader of the Liberal Democrats in the House of Lords.

Dholakia is involved with a range of charities including being a Patron of the British branch of Child In Need India (CINI UK).

In 1994 he was made an Officer of the Order of the British Empire (OBE). In 2000 he was named 'Asian of the Year', and won the Pride of India Award in 2005.  In November 2009 he was given an honorary doctorate from the University of Hertfordshire. He was a Deputy Lieutenant (DL) in the county of West Sussex from 1999 to 2012.

Dholakia was appointed to the Privy Council (PC) in December 2010.

Personal life
He has been married to Lady Dholakia, née Ann McLuskie, since 1967. They have two daughters and live in West Sussex. He is a Hindu of Gujarati origin.

Sources
Lord Dholakia biography at the site of Liberal Democrats
UK Hindu youths' quest to find roots Times of India - 26 July 2001

References

1937 births
British politicians of Indian descent
Indian peers
British Hindus
Commissioners for Racial Equality
Deputy Lieutenants of West Sussex
Dholakia, Navnit Dholakia, Baron
Life peers created by Elizabeth II
Liberal Party (UK) councillors
Councillors in East Sussex
Living people
Officers of the Order of the British Empire
Presidents of the Liberal Democrats (UK)
Tanzanian emigrants to the United Kingdom
Members of the Privy Council of the United Kingdom
British people of Gujarati descent
Recipients of Pravasi Bharatiya Samman